Russ or Russell Hamilton may refer to:

Russell Hamilton McBean (1894–1963), English naval officer in First World War
Russ Hamilton (singer) (1932–2008), English songwriter and performer
Russ Hamilton (poker player) (born 1948 or 1949), American champion in 1994 World Series of Poker
Russell Hamilton (born 1969), American singer-songwriter; stage name "Russell"

See also